Polyipnus notatus is a species of ray-finned fish in the genus Polyipnus found the South China Sea.

References 

Sternoptychidae
Fish described in 2016